This article is a list of the presidents of the RATP, i.e. the presidents of the board of directors and CEOs of the RATP.

References 

RATP Group